Lee Center Township is located in Lee County, Illinois. As of the 2010 census, its population was 593 and it contained 269 housing units.

Geography

Demographics

References

External links 
US Census
City-data.com
Cook County Official Site
Illinois State Archives

Townships in Lee County, Illinois
1849 establishments in Illinois
Townships in Illinois